Arnaldo Orfila Reynal (9 July 1897 – 13 January 1998) was an Argentine-Mexican publisher. Orfila Reynal was director of the Fondo de Cultura Económica (Economic Culture Fund) and its subsidiary in Argentina. In 1965 he founded the publishing house Siglo Veintiuno Editores with the assistance of University of Buenos Aires.

Argentine publishers (people)
Mexican publishers (people)
1897 births
1997 deaths
People from La Plata
Argentine emigrants to Mexico